Wild Ocean is a 2008 documentary 3D IMAX film about the annual migration of billions of sardines, the sardine run, up South Africa's KwaZulu-Natal coast and its human and animal impact.

External links
 
 Wild Ocean at Giant Screen Films
 
 
 

2008 films
2008 short documentary films
IMAX short films
Documentary films about marine biology
2008 3D films
IMAX documentary films
3D short films
3D documentary films
American short documentary films